Death at Victoria Dock is a crime novel by Kerry Greenwood, first published in 1992 by Poisoned Pen Press. It is the fourth novel featuring Phryne Fisher.

Plot introduction 
The Honourable Phryne Fisher is on her way home, driving past Victoria Docks in Melbourne, late evening when a shot shatters her windshield. She stops, to find a man wearing an anarchist tattoo, lying on the road, bleeding. He dies before she can get medical help. Along with her companion and maid, Dorothy 'Dot' Williams, and her friends, Burt and Cec, she attempts to solve the mystery of who shot and killed this man. Along the way she meets and is attracted to an anarchist with a strange past, who goes by the name of Peter Smith. Phryne and her friends assist Inspector Jack Robinson of the Melbourne Police to solve the murder, encountering, in the process, a bank robbing and an abduction.

Characters

Recurring characters 
 The Honourable Miss Phryne Fisher: a wealthy private detective 
 Dorothy 'Dot' Williams: Phryne's maidservant and social secretary
 Bert (Albert Johnson) and Cec (Cecil Yates): cab drivers in Melbourne who occasionally act as investigative assistants to Phryne 
 Mr and Mrs. Butler: Phryne's butler and housekeeper, respectively 
 Jane (née Graham) Fisher and Ruth (née Collins) Fisher: Phryne's Adopted Daughters
 Dr. Elizabeth Macmillan: An older woman with pepper and salt hair who is a doctor at the women's hospital and one of Phryne's best friends. 
 Detective-Inspector Jack Robinson: Phryne's favourite police detective
 Constable Hugh Collins: Young Catholic Constable who has taken a shine to Dot.

Other characters 
Peter "Smith": Latvian revolutionary and now Phryne's Lover. 
Nina Gottstein: One of the Latvian's, but she's in love with a hulking, but sweet Australian.
Bill 
Karl
Kasimov
Mr. Waddington-Forsythe - An older man of about 60 with 14-year-old twins (son and daughter). His first wife died 7 years previous, and his new wife is only 25 and expecting.
Alicia Waddington-Forsythe - A 14-year-old school acquaintance of Jane and Ruth's who is missing. Mr. Waddington-Forsythe hires Phryne to find her. 
Paul Waddington-Forsythe - Alicia's twin brother. He is arrogantly beautiful and far too attached to his young step-mother. 
Christine Waddington-Forsythe - 25-year-old secret keeping wife and step-mother who both Waddington-Forsythe men are devoted to, and who Alicia hates. 
Mother Superior - Anglican Nun who Alicia turns to for help

Australian crime novels
1992 Australian novels